Lac-à-la-Tortue Water Aerodrome  is located on Lac-à-la-Tortue,  east of Grand-Mère, Quebec, Canada and is open from May until October. The first aircraft to land here was in 1919 and it is Canada's first seaplane base.

The airport is classified as an airport of entry by Nav Canada and is staffed by the Canada Border Services Agency (CBSA). CBSA officers at this airport can handle general aviation aircraft only, with no more than 15 passengers.

See also
Lac-à-la-Tortue Airport

References

Transport in Shawinigan
Registered aerodromes in Mauricie
Seaplane bases in Quebec